Verkhny Kachmash (Ürge Qasmaş) is a rural locality (a village) in Nizhnekachmashevsky Selsoviet, Kaltasinsky District, Bashkortostan, Russia. The population was 86 as of 2010. There are 4 streets.

Geography 
Verkhny Kachmash is located 13 km northwest of Kaltasy (the district's administrative centre) by road. Ilchibay is the nearest rural locality.

References 

Rural localities in Kaltasinsky District